ILL may refer to:

 I Love Lucy, a landmark American television sitcom
 Illorsuit Heliport (location identifier: ILL), a heliport in Illorsuit, Greenland
 Institut Laue–Langevin, an internationally financed scientific facility
 Interlibrary loan, a service whereby a user of one library can borrow books or receive photocopies of documents that are owned by another library
 Willmar Municipal Airport (IATA code: ILL), a city-owned public use airport

See also
 III (disambiguation)